Notable people named Puck include:

Given name
 Puck de Leeuw (1953–2002), Dutch director
 Puck Dupp (born 1967), ring name for American wrestler Marty Garner
 Puck Moonen (born 1996), Dutch cyclist riding for Lotto–Soudal Ladies
 Puck Pieterse (born 2002), Dutch cyclist specializing in cyclo-cross and mountain biking riding for team Alpecin–Deceuninck.

Surname
 Eva Puck (1892–1979), American vaudeville star and Broadway and film actress
 Theodore Puck (1916–2005), American geneticist
 Wolfgang Puck (born 1949), Austrian celebrity chef and restaurateur

Nickname
 Bertha "Puck" Brouwer (1930–2006), Dutch sprinter
 Maria Petronella "Puck" Oversloot (1914–2009), Dutch swimmer
 Gerardus Henricus "Puck" van Heel (1904–1984), Dutch footballer
 David Edward "Puck" Rainey (born 1968), reality TV personality

Dutch feminine given names
Unisex given names